Events from the year 1911 in Scotland.

Incumbents 

 Secretary for Scotland and Keeper of the Great Seal – John Sinclair, 1st Baron Pentland

Law officers 
 Lord Advocate – Alexander Ure
 Solicitor General for Scotland – William Hunter; then Andrew Anderson

Judiciary 
 Lord President of the Court of Session and Lord Justice General – Lord Dunedin
 Lord Justice Clerk – Lord Kingsburgh

Events 
 27 January – opening of Scottish Motor Exhibition in Edinburgh.
 March–April – eleven thousand workers at the Singer Manufacturing Co. sewing machine factory on Clydebank go on strike in solidarity with twelve female colleagues protesting against work process reorganisation; four hundred alleged ringleaders are dismissed.
 2 May–4 November – Scottish Exhibition of National History, Art and Industry at Kelvingrove Park, Glasgow.
 9 May – a fire at the Empire Palace Theatre in Edinburgh kills eleven people, including illusionist Sigmund Neuberger ("The Great Lafayette") and also his lion and horse; he is buried in Piershill Cemetery with his dog Beauty.
 19 July – Thistle Chapel, designed by Robert Lorimer, dedicated in St Giles' Cathedral, Edinburgh.
 24 July – start of Scottish leg of first Daily Mail Circuit of Britain air race, Hendon–Harrogate–Newcastle–Edinburgh–Stirling–Glasgow–Carlisle.
 11 September – Sir Fitzroy Maclean, 10th Baronet, buys the ruined Duart Castle on the Isle of Mull to restore as the seat of the Clan Maclean.
 11 November – Barclay Curle launch cargo ship Jutlandia at their Clydeholm yard, the first British-built oil-engined vessel designed for ocean service.
 16 October – new building for the Mitchell Library opened in Glasgow.
 Royal Engineers balloon squadron sets up a training camp in Tentsmuir Forest on the Fife coast, predecessor of Leuchars Station.
 The Pavilion opened at Ayr.

Births 
 11 February – Alec Cairncross, economist (died 1998)
 11 March – Sir Fitzroy Maclean, 1st Baronet, soldier, writer and politician (died 1996)
 24 January – Muir Mathieson, film composer (died 1975)
 14 May – Sir John Ritchie Inch, police Chief Constable (died 1993)
 31 May – Leonard Boden, portrait painter (died 1999)
 16 June – Bobby Ancell football player and manager (died 1987)
 9 July – Brigadier Simon Fraser, 15th Lord Lovat, Chief of Clan Fraser of Lovat and Commando (died 1995)
 26 October – Sorley MacLean, poet (died 1996)
 4 December – William Baxter, Labour MP for West Stirlingshire (1959–1974) (died 1979)

Deaths 
 14 February – Eustace Balfour, architect (born 1854)
 21 May – Williamina Fleming, astronomer, discoverer of the Horsehead Nebula (born 1857)
 4 October – Joseph Bell, surgeon (born 1837)
 11 December – William McGregor, football administrator and founder of the Football League (born 1846)
 Robert Hamilton Paterson, architect (born 1843)

The arts
 Release of Rob Roy, the first British-made three-reel feature film, shot by the Scottish company United Films Ltd in studios at Rouken Glen on the edge of Glasgow and on location in Aberfoyle.
 Violet Jacob's historical novel Flemington is published.
 Harry Lauder writes the popular song "Roamin' In The Gloamin'".
 Ayr Picture Palace opens, the town's first purpose-built cinema.

See also 
 Timeline of Scottish history

References 

 
Scotland
Years of the 20th century in Scotland
1910s in Scotland